Ashraful Islam Rana (born on 1 May 1988) is a Bangladeshi professional footballer who currently plays as a goalkeeper for the Bangladesh national team & Sheikh Russel KC in Bangladesh Premier League. He also captains Sheikh Russel KC.

Club career
Rana joined the Bangladesh Army in 2003 and played local tournaments for their football team over the next decade and more. He started his professional league career with Mohammedan SC in 2015, after leaving his job in the Army. Having made his league debut at the age of 27, Rana became a regular face in both the domestic league and national team within a year.

Sheikh Russel KC
In September 2018, Ashraful Rana joined Sheikh Russel KC for 2018–19 season. As of unofficial sources, his salary of the season was 5.5 million taka. He also named captain of the team.

Under his captaincy, Sheikh Russel became runners-up in 2018-19 Independence Cup. It was Russel's first final after five years. Rana kept 4 cleansheets in 5 matches of the tournament. He kept 18 cleansheets in 2018–19 season.

Rana remained the club's captain during the 2021–22 season.

International career
Rana made his debut for national side in an International Friendly against Nepal on 19 December 2015 at Bangabandhu National Stadium.He made ten saves against UAE during an International friendly match in 2016.
On 4 September 2016 Bangladesh Football Federation announced his name as the new captain of national team.

Career statistics

International

References

Living people
1988 births
Bangladeshi footballers
Bangladesh international footballers
People from Manikganj District
Association football goalkeepers
Footballers at the 2018 Asian Games
Asian Games competitors for Bangladesh
Sheikh Russel KC players
Mohammedan SC (Dhaka) players
Abahani Limited (Chittagong) players
Saif SC players